Opacuincola is a genus of New Zealand freshwater snails in the family Tateidae.

The genus contains the following species:
 Opacuincola abradeta  Haase, 2008
 Opacuincola caeca Ponder, 1966
 Opacuincola cervicesmadentes Haase, 2008
 Opacuincola conosimilis Haase, 2008
 Opacuincola delira Haase, 2008
 Opacuincola dulcinella Haase, 2008
 Opacuincola eduardstraussi Haase, 2008
 Opacuincola favus Haase, 2008
 Opacuincola fruticis Haase, 2008
 Opacuincola geometrica Haase, 2008
 Opacuincola gretathunbergae, Verhaege & Haase, 2021
 Opacuincola ignorata Haase, 2008
 Opacuincola johannstraussi Haase, 2008
 Opacuincola josefstraussi Haase, 2008
 Opacuincola kuscheli Climo, 1974
 Opacuincola lentesferens Haase, 2008
 Opacuincola mete Haase, 2008
 Opacuincola ngatapuna Haase, 2008
 Opacuincola ovata Haase, 2008
 Opacuincola permutata Haase, 2008
 Opacuincola piriformis Haase, 2008
 Opacuincola roscoei Haase, 2008
 Opacuincola tatakaensis Haase, 2008
 Opacuincola terraelapsus Haase, 2008
 Opacuincola turriformis Haase, 2008

References 

Tateidae
Gastropods of New Zealand